Ferenc Tóth is a Hungarian glider aerobatic pilot who  won the FAI European Glider Aerobatic Championships 2000, 2006 and 2008, and the FAI World Glider Aerobatic Championships 2003.
Furthermore, he won a gold medal at  The World Games 2017 in  Wroclaw, Poland.

He's also a pilot for Hungarian airline Wizz Air.

References

Glider pilots
Aerobatic pilots
Hungarian aviators
Year of birth missing (living people)
Living people
World Games gold medalists
Competitors at the 2017 World Games